Rivonia is a township in South Africa.

Rivonia can also refer to:

Rivonia Trial, where Nelson Mandela was jailed
Rivonia Square
Rivonia (song)